This is a list of parishes located within the Roman Catholic Diocese of Portland, Maine.

Parishes

Androscoggin County

Immaculate Heart of Mary Parish
Sacred Heart Church, Auburn
Saint Philip's Church, Auburn
Prince of Peace Parish
Basilica of Saints Peter and Paul, Lewiston
Holy Cross Church, Lewiston
Holy Family Church, Lewiston
Holy Trinity Church, Lisbon Falls
Our Lady of the Rosary Church, Sabattus
Saint Teresa of Calcutta Parish
Our Lady of Ransom Church, Mechanic Falls
Saint Catherine of Siena Church, Norway
Saint Mary Church, Oxford

Aroostook County

Notre Dame du Mont Carmel Parish
Saint David Church, Madawaska
Saint Gerard-Mount Carmel Church, Grand Isle
Saint Thomas Aquinas Church, Madawaska
Our Lady of the Valley Parish
Saint Agatha Church, Saint Agatha
Saint Joseph Church, Sinclair
Saint Luce Church, Frenchville
Saint Michael Church, Birchpoint
Parish of the Precious Blood
Holy Rosary Church, Caribou
Nativity of the Blessed Virgin Mary Church, Presque Isle
Our Lady of the Lake Church, Portage
Sacred Heart Church, Caribou
Saint Catherine Church, Washburn
Saint Denis Church, Fort Fairfield
Saint Joseph Church, Mars Hill
Saint Louis Church, Limestone
Saint Mark Church, Ashland
Saint Theresa Church, Stockholm
Saint Agnes Parish
Saint Paul Church, Patten
Saint Benedict Parish
Saint Benedict Church, Benedicta
Saint John Vianney Parish
Saint Charles Borromeo Church, Saint Francis
Saint John Church, Saint John Plantation
Saint Joseph Church, Wallagrass
Saint Louis Church, Fort Kent
Saint Mary Church, Eagle Lake
Saint Mary of the Visitation Parish
Saint Mary of the Visitation Church, Houlton
Saint Peter Chanel Parish
Saint Bruno/Saint Remi Church, Van Buren
Saint Joseph Church, Hamlin

Cumberland County

All Saints Parish
Our Lady, Queen of Peace Church, Boothbay Harbor
Saint Ambrose Church, Richmond
Saint Charles Borromeo Church, Brunswick
Saint John the Baptist Church, Brunswick
Saint Katharine Drexel Church, Harpswell
Saint Mary Church, Bath
Saint Patrick Church, Newcastle
Cathedral of the Immaculate Conception (Portland, Maine)
Our Lady of Hope Parish
Saint Joseph Church, Portland
Saint Pius X Church, Portland
Parish of the Holy Eucharist
Holy Martyrs of North America Church, Falmouth
Sacred Heart Church, Yarmouth
Saint Gregory Church, Gray
Saint Jude Church, Freeport
Sacred Heart/Saint Dominic Parish 
Sacred Heart Church, Portland
Saint Anthony of Padua Parish
Our Lady of Perpetual Help Church, Windham
Our Lady of Sebago Church, Sebago
Saint Anne Church, Gorham
Saint Hyacinth Church, Westbrook
Saint Christopher Parish
Our Lady, Star of the Sea Church, Long Island
Saint John Paul II Parish
Holy Cross Church, South Portland
Saint Bartholomew Church, Cape Elizabeth
Saint Maximilian Kolbe Church, Scarborough
Saint Joseph Parish
Saint Elizabeth Ann Seton Church, Fryeburg
Saint Joseph Church, Bridgton
Saint Louis Parish and Church, Portland
Saint Peter Parish and Church, Portland

Franklin County
Our Lady of the Lakes Parish
Our Lady of the Lakes Church, Oquossoc
Saint Luke Church, Rangeley
Saint John Church, Stratton
Bell Chapel, Sugarloaf Mountain, Carrabassett Valley
Saint Joseph Parish and Church, Farmington
Saint Rose of Lima Parish and Church, Jay

Hancock County

Parish of the Transfiguration of the Lord
Holy Redeemer Church, Bar Harbor
Our Lady, Star of the Sea Church, Little Cranberry Island
Saint Ignatius Church, Northeast Harbor
Saint Peter Church, Manset
Saint Joseph Parish (Ellsworth)
Saint Joseph Church, Ellsworth
Our Lady of the Lake Church, Dedham
Saint Margaret Church, Winter Harbor
Stella Maris Parish
Our Lady of Holy Hope Church, Castine
Saint Mary, Star of the Sea Church, Stonington
Saint Vincent de Paul Church, Bucksport

Kennebec County

Corpus Christi Parish
Notre Dame Church, Waterville
Saint Helena Church, Belgrade Lakes
Saint John the Baptist Church, Winslow
Saint Michael Parish
Sacred Heart Church, Hallowell
Saint Augustine Church, Augusta
Saint Denis Church, Whitefield
Saint Francis Xavier Church, Winthrop
Saint Joseph Church, Gardiner
Saint Mary of the Assumption Church, Augusta

Knox County

Saint Brendan the Navigator Parish
Our Lady of Good Hope Church, Camden
Saint Bernard Church, Rockland
Saint Francis of Assisi Church, Belfast
Saint Mary of the Isles Church, Islesboro
Union Church, Vinalhaven
Village Episcopal Church, North Haven

Oxford County

Holy Savior Parish
Our Lady of the Snows Church, Bethel
Saints Athanasius and John Church, Rumford

Penobscot County

Christ, the Divine Mercy Parish
Saint Martin of Tours Church, Millinocket
Saint Peter Church, East Millinocket
Our Lady of the Eucharist Parish
Saint Anne Church, Danforth
Saint Leo the Great Church, Howland
Saint Mary of Lourdes Church, Lincoln
Our Lady of the Snows Parish
Saints Francis Xavier and Paul the Apostle Church, Milo
Saint Anne Church, Dexter
Saint Thomas Aquinas Church, Dover-Foxcroft
Resurrection of the Lord Parish
Holy Family Church, Old Town
Our Lady of Wisdom Church, Orono
Saint Ann Church, Bradley
Saint Ann Church, Indian Island
Saint Paul the Apostle Parish
Saint Gabriel Church, Winterport
Saint John Church, Bangor
Saint Joseph Church, Brewer
Saint Mary Church, Bangor
Saint Matthew Church, Hampden
Saint Teresa Church, Brewer

Piscataquis County

Holy Family Parish
Holy Family Church, Greenville
Saint Joseph Church, Rockwood Township
Saint Anthony of Padua Parish
Saint Faustina Church, Jackman

Somerset County
Christ the King Parish
Notre Dame de Lourdes Church, Skowhegan
Saint Peter Church, Bingham
Saint Sebastian Church, Madison
Saint Agnes Parish and Church, Pittsfield

Washington County
Saint Kateri Tekakwitha Parish
Immaculate Conception Church, Calais
Saint Ann Church, Perry
Saint Ann Church, Indian Township
Saint James the Greater Church, Baileyville
Saint John the Evangelist Church, Pembroke
Saint Joseph Church, Eastport
Saint Peter the Fisherman Parish
Holy Name Church, Machias
Sacred Heart Church, Lubec
Saint Michael Church, Cherryfield
Saint Timothy Church, Campobello Island (Canada)

York County
Good Shepherd Parish
Saint Brendan Chapel, Biddeford Pool
Saint Joseph Church, Biddeford
Saint Anne Chapel
Saint Margaret Church, Old Orchard Beach
Saint Philip Church, Lyman
Most Holy Trinity Church, Saco
Holy Spirit Parish
All Saints Church, Ogunquit
Saint Martha Church, Kennebunk
Saint Mary Church, Wells
Parish of the Ascension of the Lord
Our Lady of the Angels Church, South Berwick
Saint Christopher Church, York
Saint Raphael Church, Kittery
Star of the Sea Church, York Beach
Saint Matthew Parish and Church, Limerick
St. Thérèse of Lisieux Parish
Holy Family Church, Sanford
Notre Dame Church, Springvale

References

parishes

Portland
Culture of Portland, Maine
Portland